The National Reconstruction Front (Front pour la Reconstruction Nationale, FRN)  is a political party in Haiti. In the presidential elections of 7 February 2006, its candidate Guy Philippe won 1,97% of the popular vote. The party won in the 7 February 2006 Senate elections 2.4% of the popular vote and no Senators. In the 7 February and 21 April 2006 Chamber of Deputies elections, the party won 1 out of 99 seats.

Political parties in Haiti